Piel de otoño (English: Autumn's Skin) is a Mexican telenovela produced by Mapat L. de Zatarain for Televisa in 2005. Is a remake of the 1986 Mexican telenovela Cicatrices del alma.

On Monday, May 9, 2005, Canal de las Estrellas started broadcasting Piel de otoño weekdays at 5:00pm, replacing Inocente de Ti. The last episode was broadcast on Friday, September 23, 2005 with El Amor No Tiene Precio replacing it  on Monday, September 26, 2005.

Laura Flores and René Strickler starred as protagonists, while Sergio Goyri, Sabine Moussier and Manuel Landeta starred as antagonists. Gerardo Murguía and María Marcela starred as stellar performances. Raquel Olmedo starred as special participation.

Plot
With the love and unconditional support of his wife Lucía (Laura Flores), Ramón Mendoza (Sergio Goyri) has progressed in his work to achieve an excellent economic position. Their two children, Liliana (Florencia de Saracho) and Miguel Ángel (Franco Gala), attend the best schools and never endured the shortages that their parents suffered at the beginning of their marriage.

However, Lucía isn't happy; Ramón has become materialistic and cruel. He constantly humiliates her and has made it so that their children have lost respect for her. Liliana, spoiled and capricious, goes as far as to follow her boyfriend to Spain, where the boy gets her pregnant and abandons her.

Hiding the secret of her maternity, Liliana leaves her daughter Natalia in the care of some nuns and returns to Mexico, where she must steal money from her father in order to care for the baby. Miguel Ángel, for his part, is a lazy and irresponsible boy who believes that he deserves everything.

Lucía has become a shadow, sad and doesn't know where her dreams have gone. Her only happy moments are when, alone before her computer, she opens her heart to a twin soul who understands her, advises her, and with whom, little by little and in silence, she has been falling in love — that mysterious man whose face she can only imagine, whose voice she hasn't heard, and signs his messages simply as "wind".

Her friend Rosario (María Marcela) also carries a heavy cross. She had to flee with her children because her husband is a psychopath that beat her constantly. Eduardo (Jorge de Silva) and Gabriela (Andrea Torre) don't remember how Víctor (Manuel Landeta) was in reality; Rosario let them believe that their father was a loving and responsible man who died when they were small.

This lie creates a rift between Rosario and her children when Víctor finds them.  He wins the friendship of the young adults; Gabriela eventually leaves to live with him, and Rosario lives in a constant terror for her daughter's life.

The story of Triana (Raquel Olmedo) is a great story of love. Having left Spain three decades ago after discovering her husband in the arms of her best friend, she arrives in Mexico and meets Martín, with whom she lived for many years in love and happiness.

But after her beloved Martín's death, Triana finds out that she will be reunited with him when she is diagnosed with terminal cancer.  When she receives the news that her husband in Spain has died and she's inherited his entire fortune, Triana laughs at the irony of fate.

Before dying, she makes her will and leaves Rosario her apartment in Mexico City and Lucía her inheritance in Spain.  Rosario and Lucía feel great pain for the loss of their dear friend, and gratitude for her generosity.

One day, by coincidence, Lucía finds out that Liliana has a daughter, and wants to give her up for adoption. Lucía, who spent her childhood in an orphanage, will not allow her granddaughter to suffer as she did.

Determined, Lucía confronts Liliana, who refuses to admit the existence of the little girl.  Lucía goes to Ramón to ask for his help, but she finds him with Rebeca (Sabine Moussier), his lover.

Destroyed, Lucía receives the final blow when her son Miguel Ángel blames her for his break-up with his most recent conquest and stops talking to her. With a shattered soul and feeling that she is a hindrance for her family, she packs her things and goes to Spain to start a new life and try to find little Natalia.

In Spain she meets three of Triana's friends: Santiago (René Strickler), a distinguished painter, and Jordi (Luis Javier) and Mayte (Yolanda Ventura), who welcome her with care and offer her a home. Santiago and Lucía feel attracted to one another immediately, but, although her heart is consumed with love for Santiago, turns out to be "Wind", Lucía is still married and offers him her friendship.

In short time, Ramón asks for a divorce and annuls their marriage.  Lucía is able to restart her life with Santiago and her love for him becomes stronger, which causes the love that she had for Ramón to dissolve.  While Ramón's company collapses from debts and their children's lives sink further into vice and emptiness, Lucía transforms into a new, elegant woman who is sure of herself.

Lucía discovers her talent for finance upon becoming Mayte's associate and her fortune increases. Furthermore, her happiness is immense when, with Santiago's help, she finally finds Natalia.

Now, Lucía knows that in order to be completely happy, in order to be able to turn over her body and soul to her passionate love for Santiago, she must return to Mexico one more time and confront the fears and pain she left behind so that she can finally take out all of her illusions out of the drawer of memories and take the reins of her destiny.

The love that Santiago has shown her has reinvigorated her autumn skin, and love never arrives too late.

Cast
 
Laura Flores as Lucía Villareal Pérez de Mendoza
René Strickler as Don Santiago Mestre
Sergio Goyri as Don Ramón Mendoza
Sabine Moussier as Rebeca Franco
Raquel Olmedo as Triana Gallasteguí
Gerardo Murguía as Gustavo Hellman
María Marcela as Rosario Ruiz de Gutiérrez
Manuel Landeta as Víctor Gutiérrez
Alejandro Ávila as Bruno Dordelli
Lourdes Reyes as Claudia Lambarí
Andrea Torre as Gabriela "Gaby" Gutiérrez Ruíz
Yolanda Ventura as Mayte Gómez de Samperio
Jorge de Silva as Eduardo Gutiérrez Ruíz
Florencia de Saracho as Liliana Mendoza Villarreal
Agustín Arana as Pablo Castañeda
Franco Gala as Miguel Ángel Mendoza Villarreal
Arancha Gómez as Nora Berumen
Luis Xavier as Jordi Sampeiro
Carlos de la Mota as Diego
Osvaldo Benavides as Damián
Ramón Menéndez as Martín
Francisco Avendaño as Luis
Gabriela Rivero as Lucrecia Durán
Ricardo Crespo as Juan Carlos
Ricardo Margaleff as Edson
Rosángela Balbó as Elvira Castañeda
Susy-Lu Peña as Alexa Riveroll
Archie Lanfranco as Dr. Silva
Mónica Garza as Carmina Rubio
Marco Muñoz as Lic. Alberto Díaz
Paola Ochoa as Conchita Pérez
Joana Brito as Jovita Muñoz
Roberto Sen as Julián Bandera
Sergio Jurado as Father René Ruiz
Yousi Díaz as Cristina Miranda
Luis Bayardo as Rodrigo
Jorge Ortín as Rafael
Roberto Miquel as Octavio Escalante
Héctor del Puerto as Enrique
Abraham Stavans as Arcadio
Fernando Carrera as Jorge Poncela
Patricia Romero as Jessica Rodríguez
Óscar Alberto López as Rafa
Adrián Ruiz as Eusebio Hurtado Juárez
Claudia Troyo as Carmina
Norma Iturbe as Nurse
Jorge Peralta
Mirta Renée
Jose Maria Negri
Javier Ruán
Arturo Lorca
Benjamín Islas
Ricardo Vera

Awards

DVD release
Piel de otoño was released to region 1 DVD on 13 June 2006. The series was considerable abridged in order to fit onto the three double-sided DVD set, which contains 761 minutes of footage. In addition to bonus material, the release also features optional English subtitles.

References

External links

 at esmas.com 

2005 telenovelas
Mexican telenovelas
2005 Mexican television series debuts
2005 Mexican television series endings
Spanish-language telenovelas
Television shows set in Mexico City
Television shows set in Madrid
Televisa telenovelas